The Kansas City All-Stars was a soccer club that played a limited schedule in the 1996/97 season of the USISL I-League.

Year-by-year

External links
 United Soccer Leagues Statistical History, Part 3 (1997-1999)

Reference

A
Defunct soccer clubs in Missouri